Al-Muʿallā or Al-Maʿallā is a district in Aden Governorate, Yemen. As of 2003, the district had a population of 49,891 inhabitants.

History
Mualla's earlier history was notable for its association with dhow building. Later in the nineteenth century Mualla grew to be a port for sailing ships and small steam vessels and number of stores of goods were built along the sidewalks. In the early fifties of the twentieth century the face of the city changed completely by colonial Britain. A large sea area was reclaimed and longest street was built along with modern buildings to absorb the families of British troops.

Population
Its population in 2004 is about 69,842.

References

External links

Districts of Aden Governorate
Aden Governorate
Populated places in Aden Governorate